Incisions is the third studio album by American deathcore band Oceano. The album was released on October 1, 2013 on Earache Records. On January 28, "Slow Murder" was released as a lyric video, and on August 12 the band unveiled another song from the album, "Incisions", and also announced the album's release date.

Track listing

Personnel 
Band line-up
Adam Warren - vocals, lyrics
Devin Shidaker - lead guitar
Nick Conser - rhythm guitar
Jason Jones - bass
Daniel Terchin - drums
Production
Ken Sarafin - Artwork
Chuck Macak - Producer, Engineer, Mixing, Mastering
Kevin Doti - Engineer
Adam Hassel - Engineer
Andrew Conner - Assistant Engineer
Adam Hansen - Drums
Recorded @ Electrowerks Music Production in Downers Grove, IL

References

2013 albums
Earache Records albums
Oceano (band) albums